Lamari River is a river that originates in Kratke Range in the south central highlands of Eastern Highlands Province of Papua New Guinea.
It flows into the Purari River basin.

Population 
Awa speaking indigenous people populate Lamari river basin.
Lamari River serves as demarkation line between the Kukukuku people and their neighbours to the north-west, the Fore people.

References

Rivers of Papua New Guinea
Gulf of Papua